Irfan is a concept in Islamic mysticism. Irfan can also refer to:

 Al Irfan (magazine), literary magazine in Beirut, Lebanon
 Irfan (band), a Bulgarian ethereal world music band 
 Irfan (name), includes variant Erfan
 IrfanView, computer graphic software